The Independent Company Mounted Scouts served in the Union Army during the American Civil War. The "Independent Company" was made up of infantrymen from Indiana and was organized at Leavenworth, Kansas on August 13, 1863. They were mustered out on April 23, 1864.

See also
 List of Indiana Civil War regiments

References

Bibliography 
 Dyer, Frederick H. (1959). A Compendium of the War of the Rebellion. New York and London. Thomas Yoseloff, Publisher. .

Units and formations of the Union Army from Indiana
1863 establishments in Indiana
Military units and formations established in 1863
Military units and formations disestablished in 1864